Lichterfelde is a locality in the borough of Steglitz-Zehlendorf in Berlin, Germany. Until 2001 it was part of the former borough of Steglitz, along with Steglitz and Lankwitz. Lichterfelde is home to institutions like the Berlin Botanical Garden and Museum, the German Federal Intelligence Service (BND), the German Federal Archives and the Charité university hospital's Benjamin Franklin Campus. Many embassies and landmark-protected buildings are located in the affluent mansion settlement in Lichterfelde West.

History
The Prussian village  was founded in the 13th century by Flemish settlers.

Lichterfelde was chosen as the seat of the Prussian Main Military academy, the Preußische Hauptkadettenanstalt, in 1882, and the district became the home to many famous families from the German nobility due to their connections with the Prussian Army.

In 1920  became part of Greater Berlin.

While  was in parts badly damaged during World War II, Lichterfelde West is still largely intact and today one of the prime residential areas of Berlin. The  locality also houses the  Botanical Garden and Botanical Museum and the Campus Benjamin Franklin, built in 1968 and today part of the  university hospital.

Quarters of Lichterfelde

Lichterfelde West 

Lichterfelde West was developed as a settlement of mansions and is one of the wealthiest residential areas of Berlin. It is home to the Berlin Botanical Garden and embassies. The Teltow Canal geographically separates it from the eastern parts of Lichterfelde. Its 19th-century commercial area is centered around the Lichterfelde West railway station, which also serves nearby Free University of Berlin in neighboring Dahlem. Most of the commercial and residential buildings in Lichterfelde West are protected landmarks.

Lichterfelde Ost 
Lichterfelde Ost, like Lichterfelde West, was also developed as a settlement of mansions, yet many of the estates were damaged in World War II. The Lichterfelde Ost railway station serves as a hub for regional rail and commuter rail and is surrounded by a large commercial area.

Lichterfelde Süd 
Lichterfelde Süd was developed in the 1960s and 1970s and is large made up of suburban housing estates, being a significant architectural deviation from the older mansion settlements. The Otto Lilienthal Memorial Park with the artificial conical hill, from which he started many of his flight attempts, is located in Lichterfelde Süd.

Sights
Otto Lilienthal monument - the memorial plaque which is located in Schütte-Lanz-Straße 25, Berlin-Lichterfelde, was built in memory of Otto Lilienthal - a German pioneer of human aviation who became known as the Glider King. He was the first person to make successful gliding flights.
Berlin Botanical Garden and Botanical Museum
Lichterfelde Manor - historic manor house of the former village Lichterfelde
Lichterfelde West - a villa colony from the 19th century
Lichterfelde village church - Church from the 14th century
McNair Barracks -  former US Army installation in Lichterfelde, today a residential building

Important people

Sons and daughters of the district 
 Maximilian Beyer, Catholic pastor
 Hasso von Boehmer, Lieutenant Colonel in the General Staff, murdered resistance fighter on July 20, 1944
 Bully Buhlan, singer
 Fler, rapper
 Peter Fox, musician
 Götz George, actor
 Peter Huchel, writer
 Rolf Johannesson, Rear Admiral of the German Navy
 Max Kaus, painter and graphic artist
 Julius Posener, architectural historian
 Samra, rapper
 Nils Seethaler, Anthropologist
 Gerd Tellenbach, historian
 Bettina Wegner, songwriter and poet

Celebrities at the Lichterfelde park cemetery 

The following personalities were buried in the Parkfriedhof Lichterfelde among many others:

See also
Berlin-Lichterfelde Ost railway station
Lichterfelde Süd station
Berlin-Lichterfelde West station
Berlin Botanischer Garten station
Osdorfer Straße station

References

External links

Picture of the ancient Coat of Arms of Lichterfelde
Life in Andrews Barracks in 1969

Populated places established in the 1300s
Localities of Berlin